El Mirador (which translates as "the lookout", "the viewpoint", or "the belvedere") is a large pre-Columbian Middle and Late Preclassic (1000 BC - 250 AD) Maya settlement, located in the north of the modern department of El Petén, Guatemala. It is part of the Mirador-Calakmul Karst Basin of northern Guatemala.

Discovery
Some of the Mirador basin was surveyed in 1885 by Claudio Urrutia, who noted the presence of ruins. But El Mirador had little attention paid to it until Ian Graham spent some time there making the first map of the area in 1962.
A detailed investigation began in 1978 with an archaeological project under the direction of Bruce Dahlin (The Catholic University of America) and Ray Matheny (Brigham Young University). Dahlin's work focused primarily on the bajo swamps and mapping, while Matheny's team focused primarily on excavations in the site center and architecture. This project ended in 1983. To the surprise of the archaeologists, it was found that a large amount of construction was not contemporary with the large Maya classic cities in the area, like Tikal and Uaxactun, but rather from centuries earlier in the pre-classic era (see: Mesoamerican chronology).

In 2003, Richard D. Hansen, a Senior Scientist from Idaho State University, initiated major investigation, stabilization, and conservation programs at El Mirador with a multi-disciplinary approach, including staff and technical personnel from 52 universities and research institutions from throughout the world. By August 2008, the team had published 168 scientific papers, and produced many technical reports and scientific presentations. In the popular media  documentary films for the History Channel, National Geographic, the Learning Channel, BBC, ABC's 20/20 and Good Morning America, 60 Minutes (Australia), and the Discovery Channel were produced. In 2019, Yes Theory released The Lost Pyramid, a feature-length documentary about their adventure through the Guatemalan jungle to climb The La Danta Pyramid.

History

El Mirador flourished from about the 6th century BCE to the 1st century CE, reaching its height from the 3rd century BCE. Then it experienced a hiatus of construction and perhaps abandonment for generations, followed by re-occupation and further construction in the Late Classic era, and a final abandonment about the end of the 9th century.

One of the key elements for this tremendous rise in human population was the many bajos, seasonal swamps, in the region. Tropical-forest soil contains hardly any nutrients, and most of the nutrients present get washed away by rain. Yet the Maya developed a system that was highly productive. In the Mirador basin, the swamps provided the solution. By importing mud from the swamps by the thousands of tonnes, the Maya created mud-covered terraces ready for agriculture. By adding lime to the soil, they elevated the pH, making it suitable for a variety of crops: corn, squash, beans, cacao, cotton and palm. When the ground was depleted of nutrients, adding another layer of mud reinvigorated the fields.

There are a number of "triadic" structures (around 35 structures), consisting of large artificial platforms topped with a set of 3 summit pyramids. The most notable of such structures are three huge complexes; one is nicknamed El Tigre, with height ; another is called La Danta (or Danta) temple. When the large man-made platform that the temple is built upon (some 180,000 square meters) is included in calculations, La Danta is considered by some archeologists to be one of the largest ancient structures in the world. Also the Los Monos complex is very large (48 meters high) although not as well known. Most of the structures were originally faced with cut stone which was then decorated with large stucco masks depicting the deities of Maya mythology. According to Carlos Morales-Aguilar, a Guatemalan archaeologist from Pantheon-Sorbonne University, the city appears to have been planned from its foundation, as alignments have been found between the architectural groups and main temples, which were possibly related to solar alignments. The study reflects an importance of urban planning and sacred spaces since the first settlers. 

An additional feature of El Mirador is the quantity and size of causeways, internally linking important architectural compounds, and externally linking the numerous major ancient cities within the Mirador Basin during the later part of the Middle and Late Preclassic periods. The causeways are commonly referred to as sacbeob (the plural form of sacbe, meaning "white road" in Mayan, from sac "white" and be "road"). These are raised stone causeways rising 2 to 6 meters above the level of the surrounding landscape and measuring from 20 to 50 meters wide. One sacbe links El Mirador to the neighbouring site of Nakbe, approximately 12 km away, while another joined El Mirador to El Tintal, 20 km away.

While the city and the sister centers of the Mirador Basin thrived between 300 BCE and the Common Era (CE), apparently, the site was abandoned, as were nearly all other major sites in the area, by about 150 CE. A large wall, which must have been as high as 3 to 8 meters, had been constructed on the entire northern, eastern, and southern portions of the West Group of the city prior to its abandonment in the terminal Preclassic period, suggesting a possible threat that had been perceived by this time.

Another aspect that may have led to the downfall of the system was soil erosion due to deforestation; trees were burned as part of the process of making stucco. The Maya were fond of plastering buildings, houses, floors and even ceramics with layers of lime plaster called stucco. This plaster created a nice smooth surface which facilitated painting. With this stucco, the Maya created many astonishingly beautiful artifacts, as well as smooth-walled pyramids and 'paved' roads. But a darker side to this production became evident when consumption started to evolve into conspicuous consumption. The production of lime needs a large amount of green wood. Archeologists have calculated that for the production of 1 tonne of lime cement, 5 tonnes of limestone and 5 tonnes of wood were needed.

Excavations in and around the bajos (swamps) revealed the effects of deforestation. When trees vanish, the soil becomes loose and is easily transported by water (e.g. rain). Also, water flows downhill, and the only places in the Basin where it could flow to were these bajos. The nutrient-rich muck that was so vigorously imported from the bajos was now buried under a 2 to 3-metre thick layer of sterile clay. This cut off the driving force behind the sustainable agricultural fields. When you cannot replenish your crop fields, more and more harvests start to fail. In the end the failing crop fields led to starvation and collapse of society.

In the Late Classic period, c. 700 CE, portions of the site were reoccupied on a more modest scale, with small structures nestled among the ruins of the great preclassic center. The largest structure from this time period is scarcely more than 8 meters high, and many of the preclassic building were plundered for stone materials for construction and lime making. The Late Classic occupants, however, were noted scribes and artists. The area of the Mirador Basin is the only known source of the "codex-style ceramics", a particularly fine polychrome ceramic consisting of black line drawings on a cream colored background. The Late Classic occupation was brief, and by about 900 CE the area was again nearly completely abandoned and remains so until the present time.

Today
Richard D. Hansen, an archaeologist from the University of Utah, is the current director of the Mirador Basin Project, and according to his discoveries here, he thinks that the more than 45 mapped sites in the Mirador Basin may have formed the earliest well-defined political state in Mesoamerica.

Although containing striking examples of Preclassic Maya civilization, the remote location of El Mirador has prevented it from becoming a popular tourist site. Major plans by the current government of Guatemala include El Mirador as an important center of the Cuatro Balam Conservation and Development project.

Threats to Mirador
This large concentration of Preclassic Maya cities in Mesoamerica is threatened by massive deforestation, looting, and destruction caused by equipment used in logging road construction, which itself facilitates intrusive settlements. The Mirador Basin in the far northern Petén region of Guatemala is known for its abundance of sites, many of which are among the largest and earliest in the Maya world. Of 26 known sites, only 14 have been studied; an estimated 30 more await discovery. By the time scholars get there, looters may already have plundered them:

Trafficking in Maya artifacts is big business. George S. Stuart of the National Geographic Society has suggested that 1,000 pieces of fine pottery leave the Maya region each month, not an unreasonable estimate in light of the site damage observed. The most sought-after finds are codex-style ceramics, Late Classic (600–900 CE) black-line-on-cream pottery depicting mythological and historical events. Looters are often paid between $200 and $500 per vessel.  Collectors may pay more than $100,000 for the same pieces in a gallery or at auction. At even minimal prices this amounts to a $10-million-a-month business in stolen cultural property. Collecting Precolumbian art is often viewed as a justifiable means of preserving the past. It is, in fact, a destructive and sometimes violent business, as attested to by the recent assassination in Carmelita of Carlos Catalán, a local chiclero who had become a staunch opponent of looting in Petén.

Since 2003, California-based non-profit organization Global Heritage Fund (GHF) has been working to preserve and protect Mirador. In an October 2010 report titled Saving Our Vanishing Heritage, GHF listed Mirador as one of 12 worldwide heritage sites most "On the Verge" of irreparable loss and destruction, citing deforestation, fires, major logging, poaching, looting, and narcotics trafficking as major threats to the region.

See also
List of Maya sites
Jungle tourism
K'àak' Chi'
La Muerta
List of tallest ancient structures

References

Further reading
Argyle, J. Craig 2008 Investigación de los sistemas de recolección de agua en El Mirador, Operación 610 A-L. In Informe final de investigaciones 2007: Investigación y conservación en los sitios arqueológicos de la zona cultural y natural Mirador, edited by Lopez, Nora, Hansen, Richard D., and Suyuc-Ley, Edgar, pp. 487–497. Report filed with the Departamento de Monumentos Prehispánicos y Coloniales, Instituto de Antropología e Historia, Ministerio de Cultura y Deportes, Guatemala City (in Spanish)
Argyle, J. Craig 2009 Manejo de agua en el período preclásico en El Mirador, Petén, Guatemala: Operación 610 O, 2008. In Investigaciones multidisciplinarias en El Mirador: Informe final de la temporada 2008, Vols. 1 & II, edited by Mejía, Héctor, Hansen, Richard D., and Suyuc-Ley, Edgar, pp. 586–612. Report filed with the Ministerio de Cultura y Deportes, Instituto de Antropología e Historia, Departamento de Monumentos Prehispánicos y Coloniales, Guatemala City (in Spanish)
Argyle, J. Craig 2010 Los paneles y rasgos asociados al manejo de agua en la Gran Acrópolis de El Mirador: Operación 610-O. In Exploraciones arqueológicas en la Cuenca Mirador, 2009, edited by Mejía, Héctor E., Hansen, Richard D., and Suyuc-Ley, Edgar, pp. 539–556. Report filed with the Instituto de Antropología e Historia, Guatemala, Departamento de Monumentos Prehispánicos y Coloniales, Guatemala City (in Spanish)
Argyle, J. Craig, and Hansen, Richard D. 2010 La cosmovisión de estuco: Los paneles estucados del sistema hidráulico del Mirador. In La cosmovisión a través del tiempo: Tres mil años de historia maya. III Convención Mundial de Arqueología Maya, 2010. Casa Convento Concepción, Antigua Guatemala, June 18–20, 2010 (in Spanish)
Argyle, J. Craig, and Hansen, Richard D. 2015 Excavaciones de la Plaza Hundida Oeste, Gran Acrópolis Central, El Mirador: Operaciones 610 KK, 610 LL, 610 MM, 610 NN, 610 OO. Temporada de Campo 2014. In Investigaciones en la Cuenca Mirador, Temporada 2014, edited by Hansen, Richard D. and Suyuc-Ley, Edgar, pp. 154–171. Report presented to the Instituto de Antropología e Historia, Ministerio de Cultura y Deportes, Guatemala City. (in Spanish)
Argyle, J. Craig, and Hansen, Richard D. 2016 El friso preclásico de la Gran Acrópolis Central en El Mirador: Distribución de recursos y mitos relatados en estuco / The Preclassic Frieze of the Great Central Acropolis at El Mirador: Resource Allocation and Myth Recounted in Stucco. In Mirador: Research and Conservation in the Ancient Kaan Kingdom, edited by Hansen, Richard D. and Suyuc-Ley, Edgar, pp. 131–152. Foundation for Anthropological Research and Environmental Studies (FARES), Corporación Litográfica, Guatemala City (in Spanish)

Hansen, Richard D. 2016a The Mirador-Calakmul Cultural and Natural System: A Priceless Treasure in Guatemala and Mexico / El sistema cultural y natural Mirador-Calakmul: Un tesoro invaluable en Guatemala y Mexico. In Mirador: Research and Conservation in the Ancient Kaan Kingdom, edited by Hansen, Richard D. and Suyuc-Ley, Edgar, pp. 9–36. Foundation for Anthropological Research and Environmental Studies, Corporación Litográfica, Guatemala City

External links

Archaeologists Discover Huge Lost Civilization in Guatemala - Vice - Becky Ferreira - December 21, 2022
Scientific papers and reports on El Mirador
Explore Mirador with Google Earth at Global Heritage Fund
Mirador Basin Project (formerly RAINPEG): updates Archaeological and preservational work at El Mirador and surrounding sites by the Foundation for Anthropological Research and Environmental Studies (FARES).
 The Tombs of El Mirador: YouTube (National Geographic)
El Mirador, Photos and description of the site and the jungle hike at AmazingTemples.com
 Digital reconstruction of El Mirador

Mirador, El
Maya Preclassic Period
Former populated places in Guatemala
Archaeological theft
Populated places established in the 6th century BC
6th-century BC establishments in the Maya civilization
10th-century disestablishments in the Maya civilization
1926 archaeological discoveries